The Limerick Generating Station in Pennsylvania is located next to the Schuylkill River in Limerick Township, Montgomery County, northwest of Philadelphia.  The facility has two General Electric boiling water reactor (BWR) units, cooled by natural draft cooling towers. The two units are capable of producing over 2,200 megawatts of power, which combined would provide electricity to over 2 million households. Constellation Energy owns and operates this facility following separation from Exelon Corporation in 2022. With the exception of refueling outages, Limerick Generating Station continuously operates at 100% power. The plant is connected to the grid by several 500kv transmission lines.

For critical standby power, Limerick depends on eight Fairbanks Morse 38 8-1/8 diesel engine generator sets that each deliver 3000 kilowatts of power and are capable of achieving rated speed within ten seconds of start.

The cooling towers for the Limerick Generating Station can be seen for miles away in parts of Montgomery, Chester, and Berks counties.

History
The site was chosen and plans to build the station were announced in 1969, by the Philadelphia Electric Company (now PECO Energy, a subsidiary of Exelon). It is located approximately one mile south of Sanatoga, PA.  Community protests by the Keystone Alliance and other delays pushed the start of construction by the Bechtel Power Corporation to June 1974.

Limerick Unit 1 first attained criticality (began producing nuclear power, at limited capacity) on December 22, 1984 and was certified for commercial operation on February 1, 1986.

Limerick Unit 2 attained criticality on August 1, 1989, and commercial operation began on January 8, 1990.

President George W. Bush visited the Limerick Generating Station in May 2006 to discuss nuclear power and its role in the Advanced Energy Initiative, which he announced at the 2006 State of the Union Address.  He toured the facility, including a trip to the control room of the plant.

On October 20, 2014, the Nuclear Regulatory Commission (NRC) granted extensions for Limerick Units 1 and 2 for another 20 years. The units now are licensed to operate until 2044 and 2049 respectively.

Unit 2 of the station was scrammed from 100% power to a shutdown on June 1, 2016, at 9 am. The reactor was shut down due to an electrical fault, causing the stopping of the recirculation pumps. The steam bypass valves that lead to the main condenser were opened and Limerick went through a normal hot shutdown process.

Electricity Production

Seismic risk
The Nuclear Regulatory Commission's estimate of the risk each year of an earthquake intense enough to cause core damage to the reactor at Limerick was 1 in 18,868, according to an NRC study published in August 2010. Following the Fukushima Daiichi nuclear disaster in 2011, government regulators announced the plant would undergo further evaluations for seismic activity risk.

A quarry is located nearby which occasionally does blasting; however, this is done with the consent of plant staff.

Surrounding population

The 2010 U.S. population within  of Limerick was 252,197, an increase of 18.7 percent in a decade, according to an analysis of U.S. Census data for msnbc.com. The 2010 U.S. population within  was 8,027,924, an increase of 6.1 percent since 2000. Cities within 50 miles include Philadelphia (28 miles to city center).

See also

 Nuclear power
 Fricks Locks Historic District
 List of largest power stations in the United States
 Largest nuclear power plants in the United States

References

External links

DoE Page
Nuclear Tourist page on this site.
NRC page, listing new reactor applications.  Includes many more than the "Future" list below.
www.exeloncorp.com

Energy infrastructure completed in 1989
Nuclear power plants in Pennsylvania
Towers in Pennsylvania
Buildings and structures in Montgomery County, Pennsylvania
Exelon